"Si Me Ves Con Alguien" (English: "If You See Me With Someone") is a song by Peruvian singer Leslie Shaw. It was released by Sony Music in 2018.

Promotion
Leslie Shaw performed the song on several television shows in Perú and also toured throughout Latin America to promote the song.

Music video
The music video for the song was released on March 2, 2018 on Leslie Shaw's Vevo channel. The video was features Shaw hanging out with her friends talking about an ex and then leaving to have a girls night out.

Official versions and remixes

 Si Me Ves Con Alguien (Solo Version) - 3:26
 Si Me Ves Con Alguien (Female Remix) feat. Ali Urban y Mia Mont - 3:33
 Si Me Ves Con Alguien (Kapla & Miky Remix) feat. Kapla & Miky - 3:11

Charts

Year-end charts

Certifications and sales

References

Peruvian songs
2018 singles
Spanish-language songs
2018 songs
Leslie Shaw songs